Shaun Herock is an American football executive who is the Personnel Advisor for the Las Vegas Raiders of the National Football League (NFL). He previously served as an assistant director of college scouting for the Green Bay Packers and director of college scouting for the Oakland Raiders. He also served as the interim general manager of the Raiders for the 2018 season after the team fired general manager Reggie McKenzie.

College career
During college Herock played center and offensive tackle for the Richmond Spiders football team.

Executive career

Atlanta Falcons
Herock served as an intern the scouting department of the Atlanta Falcons.

Green Bay Packers
In 1994, he was hired by the Packers after having served as an intern for them as well, and ascended to the Assistant Director's spot in 2001.

Oakland Raiders
In May 2012, he joined his former colleague Reggie McKenzie in Oakland. He was the second Herock to have worked for the Raiders, following his father Ken. On December 10, 2018, Herock was named interim general manager after the dismissal of Reggie McKenzie. Following the season, he was not retained in either capacity by the Raiders and was replaced as general manager by Mike Mayock and as director of college scouting by Jim Abrams.

Cleveland Browns
Herock was hired by the Cleveland Browns in a personnel role in June 2019. He was promoted to national scout on May 29, 2020.

Las Vegas Raiders
In February 2022, Herock returned to the Raiders, now based in Las Vegas. Herock's new position is personnel advisor to new General Manager Dave Ziegler.

Personal life
Born in Pittsburgh, Pennsylvania, Herock is a graduate of the University of Richmond.

References

Living people
Cleveland Browns executives
Cleveland Browns scouts
Green Bay Packers executives
Green Bay Packers scouts
Oakland Raiders executives
People from De Pere, Wisconsin
People from Forsyth, Georgia
Players of American football from Pittsburgh
Richmond Spiders football players
Sportspeople from Pittsburgh
Year of birth missing (living people)